Musée archéologique may refer to:
Musée archéologique (Brumath)
Musée archéologique de Lattes
Musée archéologique de Namur
Musée archéologique (Strasbourg)